Phytophthora iranica is a plant pathogen that infects the roots of Myrtle. It was discovered in a commercial nursery in Sardinia, Italy.

References

External links
 Index Fungorum
 USDA ARS Fungal Database

iranica
Water mould plant pathogens and diseases